Gustave Kenneth Tebell (September 6, 1897 – May 28, 1969) was an American football, basketball, and baseball player, coach, and college athletics administrator. From 1925 to 1929, he coached football at North Carolina State University, where he compiled a 21–25–2 record. From 1934 to 1936, he coached at the University of Virginia, where he compiled a 6–18–4 record. From 1930 to 1951, he served as the head men's basketball coach at Virginia, achieving his first championship in just his second year. During that tenure, he compiled a 240–190 record, including a NIT berth in 1941. His 240 wins rank fourth in school history. In 1951 he became Athletic Director. Tebell also coached baseball at Virginia from 1941 to 1943 and from 1945 to 1955.

Tebell played football and basketball at the University of Wisconsin. As an end on the football team, he was selected a second-team All-American by the New York Times. After graduating, he played for the Columbus Tigers of the National Football League (NFL) in 1923 and 1924 and coached three of the team's games in 1923.

Tebell employed the “Meanwell System” on offense, named for its creator, Tebell’s coach at Wisconsin. It featured a double-post alignment with constant cuts, pivots and short passes, and also pioneered the screen.

The University of Virginia honors Tebell by giving an annual award in his name, the Gus Tebell Memorial Award, which is granted each year to the graduating male student-athlete with the highest grade point average through his four years at the university.

Head coaching record

NFL

College football

References

External links
 
 

1897 births
1969 deaths
American football ends
American men's basketball players
Guards (basketball)
Columbus Panhandles coaches
Columbus Tigers players
NC State Wolfpack football coaches
NC State Wolfpack men's basketball coaches
Virginia Cavaliers athletic directors
Virginia Cavaliers baseball coaches
Virginia Cavaliers football coaches
Virginia Cavaliers men's basketball coaches
Wisconsin Badgers baseball players
Wisconsin Badgers football players
Wisconsin Badgers men's basketball players
Sportspeople from Aurora, Illinois
Sportspeople from DuPage County, Illinois
Sportspeople from Kane County, Illinois
People from St. Charles, Illinois
Coaches of American football from Illinois
Players of American football from Illinois
Baseball coaches from Illinois
Baseball players from Illinois
Basketball coaches from Illinois
Basketball players from Illinois